Oreogetonidae is a family of flies (insects in the order Diptera). There is at least one genus, Oreogeton, and at least 30 described species in Oreogetonidae.

References

Further reading

External links

 

Empidoidea
Brachycera families